The Peltogastridae are a family of barnacles belonging to the bizarre parasitic and highly apomorphic infraclass Rhizocephala. The Peltogastridae are by far the largest family of Rhizocephala. They comprise 14 genera, 3 of which (Lernaeodiscus, Septodiscus, and Triangulus) were moved from the family Lernaeodiscidae.

Genera
These genera belong to the family Peltogastridae:

 Briarosaccus Boschma, 1930
 Dipterosaccus Van Kampen & Boschma, 1925
 Galatheascus Boschma, 1929
 Lernaeodiscus Müller, 1862
 Ommatogaster Yoshida & Osawa, 2011
 Paratriangulus Høeg & Glenner, 2019
 Peltogaster Rathke, 1842
 Pterogaster Van Baal, 1937
 Septodiscus Van Baal, 1937
 Septosaccus Duboscq, 1912
 Temnascus Boschma, 1951
 Tortugaster Reinhard, 1948
 Trachelosaccus Boschma, 1928
 Triangulopsis Guérin-Ganivet, 1911

References

External links

Barnacles
Taxa named by Wilhelm Lilljeborg